Jump on Board is the ninth studio album by Scottish alternative rock band Texas, released worldwide in April 2017. The lead single from the album, "Let's Work It Out", was released earlier in the year and charted in the singles chart in France. The second single, "Tell That Girl", was released in March 2017, just prior to the official release of the album.

Commercial performance
Jump on Board performed well commercial in the band's native Scotland, debuting at number one on the Scottish Album Charts. The album performed well in both the United Kingdom and France, where it debuted within the top ten of both album charts, while it debuted on the French Albums Charts at number one, giving the band their eighth French top ten album.

Singles
The lead single, "Let's Work It Out", was released in early 2017 to critical acclaim. The song was added to several playlists on British radio station BBC Radio 2 where it enjoyed strong airplay. Despite this airplay, the song failed to make any chart impact on any British singles chart, either physical single sales, digital download or independent chart releases. The second single to be released from Jump on Board, "Tell That Girl", was released just prior to the formal release of the album in March 2017. Again, whilst failing to chart on the United Kingdom or any other mainstream single charts across the European continent, "Tell That Girl" enjoyed strong airplay on BBC Radio 2 throughout both April and May 2017, making playlists including Great British Songbook and Today's Top Hits.

Track listing

Charts

Weekly charts

Year-end charts

Certifications

References

Texas (band) albums
2017 albums
PIAS Recordings albums